Armillaria ectypa is a species of mushroom in the family Physalacriaceae. Commonly known as the marsh honey fungus, it prefers growing in sphagnum bogs with mosses. It is classified as endangered in Great Britain, and is protected under the Wildlife and Countryside Act 1981; it is also on the provisional European red data list. A. ectypa has been observed to have both bioluminescent mycelium and fruitbodies (mainly the gills).

Description
The cap has a slightly curved margin and is often striate with the gills visible through its thin structure. The centre is dark brown and scaly. The rest of the cap is yellowish-brown to brown, paler when it is dry and darker when it is moist. The gills are rather narrow and decurrent, whitish at first, becoming cream, buff or pinkish. It is the same colour as the cap. There are no mycelial cords at the base of the stem. The spore print is white.

Distribution and habitat
The marsh honey fungus has a boreal and montane Eurasian distribution. In Europe, it has been recorded in Austria, Switzerland, the Czech Republic, Denmark, Sweden, Finland, France, Germany, Poland, the British Isles, the Netherlands, Russia and Slovakia. In Asia, it has been recorded in China, Japan and Turkey. Its typical habitat is in waterlogged habitats, in raised bogs, peat mires and alkaline fens, among Sphagnum mosses, sedges, cottongrass and reeds. It is uncommon or rare across the whole of its range. It grows on the Garron Plateau in County Antrim in Northern Ireland, this being one of the only four known sites in the British Isles.

See also
List of Armillaria species

References

ectypa
Fungi described in 1821
Fungi of Europe
Fungal tree pathogens and diseases
Taxa named by Elias Magnus Fries